31st Army may refer to:

31st Group Army, China
31st Army (Soviet Union)
Thirty-First Army (Japan), a unit of the Imperial Japanese Army